David Edward Crombie  (born April 24, 1936) is a Canadian former academic and politician who served as the 56th mayor of Toronto from 1972 to 1978. Crombie was elected to Parliament following his tenure as mayor. A member of the Progressive Conservative (PC) Party, he served as minister of national health and welfare from 1979 to 1980, minister of Indian affairs and northern development from 1984 to 1986, and secretary of state for Canada from 1986 to 1988.

Early life
Crombie was born in Swansea, then a village west of Toronto, the son of Vera Edith (Beamish) and Norman Davis Crombie. He was a lecturer in politics and urban affairs at Ryerson in the 1960s when he became involved in Toronto's urban reform movement.  At the time, the city had a very pro-development city council that allowed a great deal of demolition of older buildings, including houses, to make way for the construction of apartment blocks, office towers, and highways (see Spadina Expressway). Crombie, along with John Sewell and other urban reformers, became a leader in a grassroots movement that favoured curtailing development in favour of improving social services and prioritizing community interests.

Municipal politics

Crombie was elected to Toronto's city council in 1970, and became Mayor of Toronto in 1972, ushering in an era of socially responsible urban development inspired by thinkers such as Jane Jacobs. Crombie was the first mayor who represented the reform movement of Toronto politics, and his policies differed sharply from those of the Old Guard who preceded him.

Mayor of Toronto 
Much of Crombie's time as mayor was spent trying to rein in the development industry. He initially imposed a 45-foot (13.7 m) limit on all new constructions, but this was overturned by the Ontario Municipal Board. Crombie then put forward a new official plan that imposed varying height restrictions across the city, and this was upheld by the board.

The Spadina Expressway had been halted by premier Bill Davis in 1971, but Davis continued to support the construction of the Allen Expressway in the north. Crombie attempted but failed to have it halted. He was more successful in countering plans for the Scarborough Expressway; all work was halted during Crombie's term, leading to its eventual cancellation.

Crombie also opposed the traditional pattern of demolishing poorer neighbourhoods and replacing them with housing projects. The plans to redevelop areas such as Trefann Court, Kensington Market, and Cabbagetown ended under Crombie. Instead, he oversaw the creation of the St. Lawrence neighbourhood, an area of mid-rise, mixed-use, mixed-income buildings that followed Jane Jacobs's vision of urban planning.

Crombie was re-elected in 1974 and 1976 with large majorities. Because of his great public appeal and his height of only , he was repeatedly described in the media as the city's "tiny, perfect mayor".

Federal politics

He left City Hall in 1978 to move to federal politics, winning a by-election as a Progressive Conservative candidate that gave him a seat in the House of Commons of Canada. Crombie served as Minister of Health and Welfare in the short-lived minority government of Prime Minister Joe Clark which was elected in 1979 but lost power the next year.

Crombie stood as a candidate at the 1983 Progressive Conservative leadership convention. He finished fourth. After Mulroney led Conservatives to power in the 1984 election, Crombie became Minister of Indian and Northern Affairs, and later Secretary of State and Minister of Multiculturalism.

Royal Commission on the Future of the Toronto Waterfront 
Frustrated in Ottawa, as a Red Tory in an increasingly conservative government, Crombie decided not to run in the 1988 election, and returned to urban affairs as head of the royal commission on the Future of Toronto's waterfront (1988–92). He authored ground-breaking reports including Watershed' and Regeneration, which described new integrated approaches to sustainable planning. The Provincial Government appointed Crombie as head of a provincial agency, the Waterfront Regeneration Trust Agency (1992-1999) to implement the 83 recommendations made in the final report, Regeneration. Among these recommendations was the creation of a waterfront trail. Today the Great Lakes Waterfront Trail extends from Quebec to Sault Ste Marie along Canada's Great Lakes and the St. Lawrence River. In 1999, Crombie founded the Waterfront Regeneration Trust, as a charity, to continue the work of the provincial agency, and serves on the Board. In addition to leading work on the creation of the Great Lakes Waterfront Trail, the charity manages a fund for the protection and restoration of the Rouge Valley, now part of the Rouge National Urban Park. Crombie tried to find an alternative to Red Hill Creek Expressway but the Hamilton city council dismissed his compromise proposal out of hand as being insufficient.

First Nations and Inuit health reform 
In September, 1979, Crombie, a liberal-minded reformer, as Minister of Health and Welfare under the Conservative government Prime Minister Joe Clark, issued a statement representing "current Federal Government practice and policy in the field of Indian health." Crombie declared that the "Federal Government is committed to joining with Indian representatives in a fundamental review of issues involved in Indian health when Indian representatives have developed their position, and the policy emerging from that review could supersede this policy". In the previous year, Indian bands and organizations such as the Union of B.C. Chiefs, the Native Brotherhood and United Native Nations engaged in intense lobbying for Indians to control delivery of health services in their own communities and for the repeal of restrictive service "guidelines introduced in September 1978, to correct abuses in health delivery, and to deal with the environmental health hazards of mercury and fluoride pollution affecting particular communities." Crombie appointed Gary Goldthorpe, as commissioner of the federal inquiry (known as the Goldthorpe Inquiry) into "alleged abuses in medical care delivery at Alert Bay, British Columbia." In 1979 Justice Thomas Berger, who headed the royal commission dealing with Indian and Inuit healthcare, recommended to Crombie that there be greater consultation with Indians and Inuit regarding the delivery of healthcare programs and that an "annual sum of $950,000 was allocated for distribution by the National Indian Brotherhood to develop health consultation structures within the national Indian community." Crombie's successor as Liberal Minister of Health and Welfare, Monique Begin, adopted Berger's recommendations, ushering in the beginning of a change in the way in which health delivery.

Later career
Crombie was appointed Ryerson's first chancellor in 1994 when the polytechnic was granted university status. He served in that role until 1999.

Throughout the 1990s, he served in various advisory capacities to city and provincial governments relating to urban issues in the Toronto area. In 2007 he retired as CEO of the Canadian Urban Institute. In April, 2008, the Toronto District School Board selected Crombie to negotiate a solution to keep unfunded school swimming pools open to the public. In 2014 he publicly opposed plans by the federally run Toronto Port Authority to lengthen runways at Billy Bishop Airport on the Toronto Islands to enable Porter Airlines to expand with jet planes.

On May 13, 2004, Crombie was appointed an Officer of the Order of Canada. In 2012, he was made a member of the Order of Ontario. In 2013, he was inducted into the Canadian Disability Hall of Fame. Crombie serves on the Governors' Council of the Toronto Public Library Foundation, the Honorary Council for the Loran Scholars Foundation, and the boards of CivicAction and the Planet in Focus Foundation. In addition, Crombie is a member of the Patron's Council at Dying with Dignity Canada. He also serves on the advisory boards of the Ryerson Image Centre and CARP Canada.

A park named after Crombie runs from Jarvis Street to Berkeley Street, in a formerly industrial area, that was converted to housing.

Personal life
Crombie is the father of two daughters, Robin and Carrie, and actor Jonathan Crombie, who starred in three Anne of Green Gables TV series. Jonathan died in New York on April 15, 2015, of a brain hemorrhage at age 48. His organs were donated, he was cremated and his ashes returned to Canada.

References

Bibliography

External links
  

1936 births
Living people
Canadian political scientists
Mayors of Toronto
Metropolitan Toronto councillors
Members of the 21st Canadian Ministry
Members of the 24th Canadian Ministry
Members of the House of Commons of Canada from Ontario
Officers of the Order of Canada
Members of the Order of Ontario
Members of the King's Privy Council for Canada
Progressive Conservative Party of Canada MPs
University of Toronto alumni
Canadian Ministers of Health and Welfare
Chancellors of Toronto Metropolitan University
Canadian Disability Hall of Fame
Progressive Conservative Party of Canada leadership candidates